Lieutenant-Colonel Christian Henry Charles Guest (15 February 1874 – 9 October 1957), usually known as Henry Guest, was a Liberal Party politician in the United Kingdom.

Family
He was the second son of Ivor Guest, 1st Baron Wimborne and his wife Lady Cornelia Henrietta Maria Spencer-Churchill, an aunt of the future Prime Minister Winston Churchill. His elder brother Ivor Churchill Guest was one of the last Lord-Lieutenants of Ireland, and his younger brothers Frederick Guest and Oscar Guest were also members of parliament.

In 1911, he married the Honourable Frances Lyttelton (1885–1918), daughter of the 8th Viscount Cobham. They had one son, John Guest (1913–1997).

Military career
Guest obtained a commission in 3rd Battalion of the Lancaster Fusiliers in 1892, and in the 1st Royal Dragoons in 1894. He served in the Second Boer War, South Africa, 1899–1902 (despatches, Queen's medal 5 clasps, King's medal 2 clasps), and 1901 was seconded for service on the Staff. After the end of the war in South Africa he was from June 1902 Aide-de-camp to Brigadier-General Burn-Murdoch, General officer in command of the Standerton District. He returned home from South Africa on the SS Saxon in late December 1902. Guest then served in India 1903–07. Upon his return to the UK he attended Staff College in 1907, and was instructor in Cavalry School. He later served in World War I 1914–15 and 1918.

Political career
His younger brother Freddie was elected as Liberal Member of Parliament (MP) for East Dorset at the January 1910 general election, but was unseated after election irregularities by his constituency agent. At the resulting by-election in June 1910, Henry was elected to succeed him. At the December 1910 general election, Henry was returned for the Pembroke and Haverfordwest constituency and Freddie was re-elected for East Dorset.

When his Pembroke and Haverford West seat was abolished for the 1918 general election, Guest stood as a Coalition Liberal candidate in the Wandsworth Central seat in South London, where he came a poor third.

He returned to the House of Commons at the 1922 general election, as National Liberal MP for Bristol North. However, he was defeated at the 1923 election, and stood aside in 1924 in favour of his brother Freddie.

Henry did not stand for Parliament again until his brother's death in 1937, when he won the by-election for Freddie's seat of Plymouth Drake as a Conservative. He held that seat until his defeat at the 1945 general election.

References

External links
 

1874 births
1957 deaths
Younger sons of barons
Liberal Party (UK) MPs for Welsh constituencies
Conservative Party (UK) MPs for English constituencies
National Liberal Party (UK, 1922) politicians
Members of the Parliament of the United Kingdom for English constituencies
UK MPs 1910
UK MPs 1910–1918
UK MPs 1922–1923
UK MPs 1935–1945
Politics of Dorset
Politics of Bristol
Politics of Devon
Politics of the London Borough of Wandsworth
Henry
Members of the Parliament of the United Kingdom for Pembrokeshire constituencies